In Greek mythology, Eupeithes  (Εὐπείθης Eupeíthēs) was the father of Antinous, the leader of the suitors of Penelope.  After his son's death at the hands of Odysseus, Eupeithes tried to revolt against his rule.  He was killed by Odysseus' father, Laertes. Apparently, he had forgotten the favor Odysseus had done for him years before when he committed a piratical raid on Cephallenia. Odysseus protected him from vengeful Cephallenians who wanted to kill him. Yet he let his son lead the suitors in destroying Odysseus' home.

His name means "obedient".

See also
 List of Greek mythological figures

Note

Reference 

 Homer, The Odyssey with an English Translation by A.T. Murray, PH.D. in two volumes. Cambridge, MA., Harvard University Press; London, William Heinemann, Ltd. 1919. . Online version at the Perseus Digital Library. Greek text available from the same website.

Characters in the Odyssey